Phyllomacromia pallidinervis is a species of dragonfly in the family Corduliidae. It is found in Ethiopia, Kenya, and Somalia. Its natural habitats are subtropical or tropical dry shrubland, subtropical or tropical moist shrubland, and rivers. It is threatened by habitat loss.

References

Corduliidae
Taxonomy articles created by Polbot